China Merchants Shenzhen Xunlong Shipping Co. Ltd., otherwise known as Xunlong Shipping or Xunlong Ferries, operates high speed catamaran ferry services from Shenzhen, Guangdong, China. It is a part of the China Merchants Group.

History
Established in November, 1993 and commenced commercial operations in October, 1995.

Routes and ports

Home Terminal in Shenzhen:
 Shekou (蛇口), Shenzhen - Shekou Passenger Terminal (Until October 31, 2016)
 Shekou (蛇口), Shenzhen - Shenzhen Prince Bay Cruise Homeport (From November 1, 2016)

Terminals in Hong Kong:

 Hong Kong China Ferry Terminal (中港城碼頭)
 Hong Kong–Macau Ferry Terminal (港澳碼頭)
 Skypier at Hong Kong International Airport (海天碼頭)

Terminals in Macau:

 Outer Harbour Ferry Terminal
 Taipa Temporary Ferry Terminal

Terminal in Zhuhai, China

 Jiuzhou Port (珠海九洲港)

Fleet

There are 8 high speed catamaran ferries in the fleet, which are a mix of Australian and Norwegian built vessels. They serve 60 services per day.

A new ferry with a capacity of 234 passengers was ordered from Dutch marine designers, CoCo Yachts. It is an aluminium catamaran, to be built by the shipyard Plenty Ships, due for delivery during 2016.

References

External links

China Merchants Shenzhen Xunlong Shipping Company Limited

Ferry companies of China
Chinese companies established in 1993